Claudia Marjorie Miranda Rojas (born 7 June 1968) is a Chilean professional dancer.

Career
A year later, she was hired for the Viña del Mar Song Festival. She participated in commercials for products such as Cheldiz jeans, and appeared on the program Bailando con Claudia, also on the state network.

While dancing for the program's guest, Spanish singer Raphael, he touched her buttock, a moment that was captured by photojournalists and appeared in newspapers the next day.

In the mid-1990s, Miranda joined the TVN morning magazine Buenos Días a Todos.

In 2006, she won the first season of El Baile en TVN. In 2007, she returned to the Viña Festival as an official choreographer. She continued as a juror and dancer of El baile on TVN until 2008.

She also participated, along with her daughter Amanda, in a commercial for the "Yo Tomo, Yo Como" campaign to promote the consumption of dairy products, and had a brief appearance on the telenovela Veinteañero a los 40 (Canal 13, 2016).

In 2019, in addition to her work on Rojo and Sigamos de largo, Miranda participated as a juror on the pilot episode of the dance program El duelo.

Personal life
Claudia Miranda is the daughter of Baltazar Miranda Pérez and Flor Eulogia Rojas Grez. She has been married to Argentine producer Alejandro Omar Costella since 25 February 1999. They met in a nightclub when she was 25. They were together for only three weeks because he accepted a job in Spain, and they maintained a long-distance relationship for eight months. Later, they married and had two children.

Filmography

References

External links
 

1968 births
Chilean female dancers
Living people
People from Santiago